Vítek Vaněček (born 9 January 1996) is a Czech professional ice hockey goaltender for the New Jersey Devils in the National Hockey League (NHL).

Playing career
Vaněček originally played as youth within HC Havlíčkův Brod through to the under-18 level before joining the ranks of HC Bílí Tygři Liberec in 2013.

Vaněček was picked 39th overall in the 2014 NHL Entry Draft by the Washington Capitals. On 15 July 2014, he was signed to a three-year entry-level contract with the Capitals.

In the 2014–15 season, he played two games with the HC Bílí Tygři Liberec of the Czech Extraliga and spent much of the rest of the season with HC Benátky nad Jizerou of the 1st Czech Republic Hockey League.

Washington Capitals

Vaněček continued his career the following season in North America, splitting time between playing for the South Carolina Stingrays and the Hershey Bears, affiliates to the Capitals.  Following a successful 2015–16 season with the Stingrays, he was selected to the ECHL All-Rookie Team.

In 2019, Vaněček was selected to his first AHL All-Star classic roster. Later in 2020, Vaněček would replace Michael Sgarbossa on the 2020 AHL All-Star classic roster. He would go on to be named MVP of the event after leading the Atlantic Division to a championship, only allowing two goals in four games.

Vaněček was named as the Capitals' backup goaltender shortly before the 2020–21 season, backing up Ilya Samsonov. However, Samsonov was placed on the COVID-19 protocol list in mid-January after only two appearances, and Vaněček was subsequently thrust into the spotlight for the Capitals. Vaněček started in his first NHL game on 15 January 2021, saving 30 of 31 shots and earning his first victory as the Capitals defeated the Buffalo Sabres 2–1. Vaněček won NHL's Rookie of the Month for January 2021. He recorded his first NHL shutout on 15 March, in a 6–0 victory over the Buffalo Sabres. When Samsonov landed in protocol again, Vaněček started Game 1 for Washington in the 2021 Stanley Cup playoffs. However, he was injured early in the game and had to be replaced by Craig Anderson.

On 21 July 2021, Vaněček was selected from the Capitals at the 2021 NHL Expansion Draft by the Seattle Kraken. The Kraken traded him back to the Capitals a week later for a second-round pick in 2023. Vaněček's highest save shutout came on January 28, 2022 when the Capitals beat the Dallas Stars 5–0.

New Jersey Devils
For the second consecutive off-season, Vaněček left the Capitals organization after he was traded at the 2022 NHL Entry Draft to the New Jersey Devils in exchange for a swap of second-round draft picks and a third-round pick on 8 July 2022. As a restricted free agent, Vaněček was later signed to a three-year, $10.2 million contract extension with the Devils on 19 July.

International play
Vaněček played three games at the 2015 World Junior Ice Hockey Championships for the Czech Republic men's national junior ice hockey team.

Career statistics

Regular season and playoffs

International

References

External links
 

1996 births
Living people
Czech ice hockey goaltenders
HC Benátky nad Jizerou players
HC Bílí Tygři Liberec players
Hershey Bears players
New Jersey Devils players
South Carolina Stingrays players
Sportspeople from Havlíčkův Brod
Washington Capitals draft picks
Washington Capitals players
Czech expatriate ice hockey players in the United States